The Lyon–Budapest railway axis (officially designated as Railway axis Lyon-Trieste-Divača/Koper-Divača-Ljubljana-Budapest-Ukrainian border) is a project of the Trans-European high-speed rail network (TEN-R), which involves the creation of a  high-speed rail line between Lyon and Budapest, finally heading to the Ukrainian border.

Sections

Lyon-Turin 

The Turin–Lyon high-speed railway is a planned -long,  railway line that will connect the two cities and link the Italian and French high-speed rail networks. The core of the project is a base tunnel measuring 57.5 km crossing the Alps between the Susa valley in Italy and Maurienne in France. The tunnel will be the longest rail tunnel in the world, being longer than the Gotthard Base Tunnel, which measures 57.1 km, and it represents one third of the estimated overall cost of the project.

Turin-Ljubljana

Ljubljana-Budapest

Budapest-Ukrainian border

See also 
Mont d'Ambin Base Tunnel
 Main line for Europe
 Trans-European high-speed rail network

References

Transport and the European Union
High-speed rail in Europe